The 2008 Ohio Republican presidential primary took place on March 4, 2008. That night, candidate John McCain secured enough delegate votes to win the Republican nomination for the 2008 United States presidential election.

Results
McCain won every county in the state.

* Candidate had dropped out of the race before March 4.

3 other unpledged delegates will also be sent to the Republican convention to bring Ohio's total delegate count to 88.

See also
 2008 Ohio Democratic presidential primary
 2008 Republican Party presidential primaries

References

Ohio
2008 Ohio elections
2008
Republican Party (United States) events in Ohio